The Story of Tracy Beaker is a British children's drama media franchise that focuses on the lives and experiences of young people and their care workers in care. This is a list of spin-off's to the trilogy of CBBC children's drama series The Story of Tracy Beaker, Tracy Beaker Returns and The Dumping Ground, which have spanned nineteen years between them. 

{{DISPLAYTITLE:List of The Story of Tracy Beaker (franchise) spin-offs}}

Spin-offs overview

The Story of Tracy Beaker
Tracy Beaker: The Movie of Me

Tracy Beaker: The Movie of Me is a television movie and a spin-off to The Story of Tracy Beaker that broadcast on 21 February 2004 on BBC One, outside of the CBBC programming block. The film was shot in Cardiff, Wales, with scenes at Castell Coch, and London, England. The movie was released on DVD on 25 July 2005.

Originally broadcast part-way through the release of Series 3, the exact placement of this story in the wider continuity of the series is debatable. The Dumping Ground is as it appears in Series 2, with the subtle additions introduced in the third series being absent (notably, the repainting of the living room from beige to blue). After The Movie of Me was finished in January 2004, production moved to Skomer Care Home (Cliffside) in Penarth due to management changes. This suggests that the special was filmed prior to Series 3, despite featuring cast members that would only be introduced in the following episodes. The story presumably took place before Series 4, as Tracy appears to be living with Cam at the start of the fourth series. The story likely does not take place during the events of Series 3, however. A number of cast members from Series 3 are absent from the movie (most notably Bouncer appearing but Lol, Michael and Nathan being absent, although Jackie, Hayley, Crash, Layla, Marco and Shelley, who joined in Series 3, seem to be in this film), suggesting that this story takes place some time after the events of that series. Despite being aired while the third season was still airing, the episode would have to take place in-between the third and fourth season, given that Tracy is still living at the DG at the end of season 3 and is now living with Cam at the start of season 4. This creates a continuity error as Justine is shown to be living at the Dumping Ground in the movie, even thought she left to live with her dad after the episode Good as Gold (the season 3 finale).

Cast

Tracy Beaker Returns

Tracy Beaker Survival Files

Tracy Beaker Survival Files is a spin-off to Tracy Beaker Returns that broadcast on 16 December 2011 and ended on 6 January 2012 on CBBC. It consists of thirteen, thirty-minute episodes and is the first and only Tracy Beaker Returns spin-off. It is an accompanying miniseries to Tracy Beaker Returns Series 2 & 3, with archive footage from The Story of Tracy Beaker.

Cast

Episodes

The Dumping Ground

Jody In Wonderland
Jody In Wonderland is a spin-off to The Dumping Ground that broadcast on 16 December 2013 on CBBC; it aired between the first and second series. The episode is sixty minutes in length and is the first The Dumping Ground spin-off.

Cast

The Dumping Ground Survival Files

Liam's Story
Liam's Story is a CBBC webseries, airing with the second series of The Dumping Ground. The last episode is also the finale of that series, although some lines and scenes differ from each other.

The Dumping Ground Dish Up

The Dumping Ground: I'm...

Floss The Foundling

Floss The Foundling is a spin-off and crossover with Hetty Feather and a spin-off to The Dumping Ground that broadcast on 25 March 2016 on BBC iPlayer; it aired at the end of the first half of the fourth series. The episode is five-minutes in length and is the sixth The Dumping Ground spin-off.

Cast

Dumping Ground Island
Dumping Ground Island is a spin-off to The Dumping Ground that broadcast on 22 December 2017 on CBBC; it aired at the end of the fifth series. The episode is sixty-minutes in length and is the seventh spin-off to The Dumping Ground. It is filmed in the North East of England as well as Crete, Greece and is the first episode across the Tracy Beaker franchise that has been filmed abroad.

Cast

Sasha's Contact Meeting
Sasha's Contact Meeting is a miniseries of webisodes and spin-off to The Dumping Ground that broadcast on 6 April 2018 on BBC iPlayer; it aired at the end of the first half of the sixth series. The series consists of five episodes and is the eight spin-off to The Dumping Ground''.

Cast

After The DG

The Joseph & Taz Files

References

The Dumping Ground
Tracy Beaker series